Barcelos may refer to:
 Barcelos, Amazonas a municipality in the state of Amazonas
 Barcelos, Portugal, a municipality in the district of Braga
 Barcelos (parish), a former-civil parish in the municipality of Barcelos

People with the name
 Pêro de Barcelos, Portuguese explorer of North America

See also
Barceló
 Count of Barcelos, a title of nobility in Portugal